David Qualter (born 2002) is an Irish hurler who plays for Kildare Senior Championship club Maynooth and at inter-county level with the Kildare senior hurling team.

Career

Qualter played hurling at juvenile and underage levels with Maynooth GAA club. After winning a Kildare MAHC title in 2020, he went on to win a Kildare IHC title after a defeat of Naas in the final. Qualter first appeared on the inter-county scene as a member of the Kildare minor hurling team in 2019 and ended the season as the team's top scorer with 8-37. He progressed onto the Kildare under-20 team and joined the Kildare senior team for the 2021 National League.

Career statistics

Honours

Maynooth
Kildare Intermediate Hurling Championship: 2020
Kildare Minor A Hurling Championship: 2020

References

2002 births
Living people
Maynooth hurlers
Kildare inter-county hurlers